Karvanista is a recurring character in British science fiction series Doctor Who. The character made his first appearance during the episode "The Halloween Apocalypse" in the thirteenth series otherwise entitled as Flux. Karvanista is played by actor Craige Els. It was revealed that Karvanista was a companion to the Fugitive Doctor in "Once, Upon Time".

Character 
Karvanista is a Lupari, a canine-like warrior race which is species-bonded to humanity which is regarded as their obligation and honour. He had a close relationship with his mother and was particularly angered when Dan Lewis mentioned her. Over the years, Karvanista earned himself the title "Vanquisher of the Thousand Civilisations".

At some point in the past, Karvanista was a companion of the Fugitive Doctor (Jo Martin) when she was part of a Time Lord organisation known as "The Division" who went up against Ravagers called Swarm (Matthew Needham/Sam Spruell) and Azure (Rochenda Sandall). After the Doctor had left him, the Division erased her memories and installed an implant in Karvanista’s brain that would poison him if he would tell the Doctor more about their connected past.

In the present of the thirteenth series Karvanista’s designated human to save is Dan Lewis (John Bishop). While he fulfills this task with determination, he expresses disdain of humans, especially of Dan, and also of the Doctor (Jodie Whittaker) who tries to intervene, describing the latter as useless and annoying.

Storyline 
Karvanista is first seen in the series threatening the Doctor and Yasmin Khan (Mandip Gill) with acid and a number of other booby traps which they ultimately escape. Karvanista then attacks Dan Lewis, kidnapping him and taking him to his spaceship. Upon the Doctor arriving to rescue Dan, she confronts him about any information that he may have about a group called the Division. Karvanista explains his reason for kidnapping Dan: members of his race are bound to a human on Earth. He later assists in getting the Lupari to help shield Earth from the Flux.

Days later when Dan infiltrates a Sontaran ship and is about to be killed, Karvanista comes to his rescue and together they destroy Sontaran ships being built all over Albert Dock. Karvanista expresses joy when Dan chooses to travel with the Doctor.

Sometime later, Karvanista takes control of a rogue Lupari ship that is piloted by a young woman Bel (Thaddea Graham) and is annoyed about her not being one of his species. He boards her ship with the intent on either killing or capturing her. They are both attacked by Sontarans who were set on destroying all the Lupari. Eventually a version of the Doctor shows up to help both and then takes command of the ship to ram a Sontaran base. The Doctor and Karvanista willingly allow themselves to be captured where Karvanista learns that the Sontarans destroyed the rest of his race. During a conversation with the Doctor he reveals that if he ever gives her the answers she seeks about her time in the Division, an implant in his brain will poison him, but he confirms he was her companion at one time and it deeply hurt him when she left him. Later on with the help of Bel and Vinder (Jacob Anderson) they defeat the Sontarans who had led both the Daleks and Cybermen to their demise by letting the Flux consume all the Sontaran ships. After the fight is over, Vinder and Bel decide to join him on his ship travelling in space over which Karvanista expresses disgust.

Development
Els had already portrayed a work friend of Dan Lewis in a promo introducing Dan as the next companion on New Years Day 2021, but it was later announced that he would play the character of Karvanista.

Huw Fullerton of RadioTimes theorised that Karvanista could have been a villain from the first look footage of the character, saying "But there's also a new baddie on the block, as revealed in the first-look footage – a creature called Karvanista (pictured), who looks set to be joining the other alien nasties in giving Jodie Whittaker's Doctor a hard time this autumn. Furry, dog-faced and armed with a pretty snazzy sci-fi axe, Karvanista looks like he's the Whoniverse version of a Wookiee – Whobacca, if you will – though only time will tell is he's on the side of angels or devils in the new series."

In an interview, Els expressed interest in reprising his role as Karvinista in Big Finish audio stories, saying that he would "absolutely" be open to return: "I'm living for it. I'm waiting for the phone call. "It's a Dog's Life", starring Karvanista and Bel and Vinder. [laughs] Bring it on!"

Reception
Harry Fletcher from Metro commented how the Lupari have "endeared themselves to fans". Upon first look of the character Fullerton from RadioTimes had made a comment about the potential for plushie toys based on Karvanista by saying "one thing’s for sure – someone, somewhere, is already planning the Karvanista plushy toy. And we’re not not already clearing some space on the shelf for it."

References

Doctor Who companions
Television characters introduced in 2021
Fictional sole survivors